Samuel Wassall VC (July 1856 – 31 January 1927) was an English recipient of the Victoria Cross, the highest and most prestigious award for gallantry in the face of the enemy that can be awarded to British and Commonwealth forces.

Details
Wassall was 22 years old, and a private in the 80th Regiment of Foot (later The South Staffordshire Regiment), British Army during the Anglo-Zulu War when the following deed took place on 22 January 1879 at the Battle of Isandlwana, Zululand, South Africa, for which he was awarded the VC:  
.

The medal
His Victoria Cross is displayed at the Museum of the Staffordshire Regiment in Whittington, Staffordshire.

References

Monuments to Courage (David Harvey, 1999)
The Register of the Victoria Cross (This England, 1997)

External links
Location of grave and VC medal (Cumbria)
Various information relating to his life, his award and his death Collated by Rob Wassell as part of his genealogy site

1856 births
1927 deaths
Military personnel from Birmingham, West Midlands
South Staffordshire Regiment soldiers
British recipients of the Victoria Cross
Anglo-Zulu War recipients of the Victoria Cross
British Army personnel of the Anglo-Zulu War
British Army recipients of the Victoria Cross
Burials in Lancashire